is the 15th single by the Japanese girl idol group Berryz Kobo. It was released in Japan on November 28, 2007, and debuted at number 6 in the weekly Oricon singles chart.

Track listings

CD single 
 
 
 "Tsukiatteru no ni Kataomoi" (Instrumental)
 
 Limited Edition DVD
 "Tsukiatteru no ni Kataomoi" (Dance Shot Ver.)

DVD single "Tsukiatteru no ni Kataomoi" Event V 
 "Tsukiatteru no ni Kataomoi" (Dance Close-up Ver.)

Charts

References

External links 
 Profile on the Up-Front Works official website

2007 singles
2007 songs
Japanese-language songs
Berryz Kobo songs
Songs written by Tsunku
Piccolo Town singles
Torch songs
Song recordings produced by Tsunku